Daniela Kerkelova (original name: Даниела Керкелова, born  in Devin) was a Bulgarian weightlifter, competing in the 69 kg category and representing Bulgaria at international competitions. 

She participated at the 2000 Summer Olympics in the 69 kg event. She competed at world championships, most recently at the 1999 World Weightlifting Championships.

Major results

References

External links
 
 http://www.olystats.com/individual_profile.php?AID=24322
 http://www.alamy.com/stock-photo-bulgarias-daniela-kerkelova-lifts-1275-kg-in-the-69kg-category-of-118668495.html

1969 births
Living people
Bulgarian female weightlifters
Weightlifters at the 2000 Summer Olympics
Olympic weightlifters of Bulgaria
People from Smolyan Province
20th-century Bulgarian women
21st-century Bulgarian women